Jiyen Krishnakumar is an Indian film director, who has worked on Malayalam and Tamil language films. He became known for the drama College Days (2010), and has gone on to make feature films including Kaanchi (2013) and the Tamil thriller film Run Baby Run (2023).

Career
Jiyen Krishnakumar began his career working on Malayalam films, notably making two films with Indrajith Sukumaran — College Days (2010) and Kaanchi (2013). His third film Tiyaan (2017), was produced on a larger budget, and featured Prithviraj in the leading role alongside Indrajith. With minimal promotions, the film opened to mixed reviews from critics. In 2023, Jiyen's first Tamil film Run Baby Run starring RJ Balaji and Aishwarya Rajesh was released.

His next release will be Paramaguru, an action drama film starring Sasikumar in the lead role. The film began production in 2019 and was delayed owing to the COVID-19 pandemic. He has also agreed terms to work on another film for Prince Pictures following the favourable response to Run Baby Run.

Filmography
As director

References

External links

Living people
Tamil film directors
Film directors from Kerala
Year of birth missing (living people)
21st-century Indian film directors
Indian screenwriters